Laurent Abergel (born 1 February 1993) is a French professional footballer who plays as a defensive midfielder for Ligue 1 club Lorient.

Career
Abergel is a youth exponent from Marseille. On 25 June 2013, he signed a three-year deal with Marseille. In July 2013, he was promoted to the first team. He made his professional debut for Marseille on 5 January 2014 in a Coupe de France game against Stade de Reims entering the field after 105 minutes as a substitute for Kassim Abdallah.

He was loaned out to Ligue 2 side AC Ajaccio for the 2014–15 season.

On 31 July 2015, Abergel signed a two-year contract with AC Ajaccio.

On 8 July 2017, after the expiration of his contract with Ajaccio, Abergel signed with AS Nancy on a three-year contract.

In July 2019, Abergel joined Ligue 2 rivals FC Lorient on a three-year contract.

References

External links
 
 Eurosport profile

Living people
1993 births
Association football midfielders
French footballers
Olympique de Marseille players
AC Ajaccio players
AS Nancy Lorraine players
FC Lorient players
Ligue 1 players
Ligue 2 players
21st-century French Jews
French people of Moroccan-Jewish descent
Jewish French sportspeople
Jewish footballers